Songs for Drella is a 1990 album by Lou Reed and John Cale, both formerly of the Velvet Underground; it is a song cycle about Andy Warhol, their mentor, who had died following routine surgery in 1987. Drella was a nickname for Warhol coined by Warhol superstar Ondine, a contraction of Dracula and Cinderella, used by Warhol's crowd but never liked by Warhol himself. The song cycle focuses on Warhol's interpersonal relations and experiences, with songs falling roughly into three categories: Warhol's first-person perspective (which makes up the vast majority of the album), third-person narratives chronicling events and affairs, and first-person commentaries on Warhol by Reed and Cale themselves. The songs, in general, address events in their chronological order.

Recording
Lou Reed and John Cale spoke to one another for the first time in years at Warhol's memorial service at St. Patrick's Cathedral in New York on April 1, 1987. The painter Julian Schnabel suggested they write a memorial piece for Warhol. On January 7 and 8, 1989, Cale and Reed performed an almost-completed Songs for Drella at The Church of St. Anne's in Brooklyn. Still, as Cale was wrapping up Words for the Dying, and Reed had finished and was touring with his New York album, the project took another year to complete. The first full version (notably with the inclusion of "A Dream" in one performance) was played on November 29–30, and December 2–3 at the Next Wave Festival at the Brooklyn Academy of Music. On December 4–5, 1989, a live performance—without an audience—was filmed at the Brooklyn Academy of Music, directed by Ed Lachman, and released on VHS and laserdisc formats. Over the following two months, Reed and Cale proceeded to record the material for the album, which was released in 1990 by Sire Records.

The album was the pair's first full collaborative record since 1968's White Light/White Heat, and by the end of recording Cale vowed never to work with Reed again due to personal differences; plans to support the album with a tour were shelved. Nevertheless, Songs for Drella would prove to be the prelude to a Velvet Underground reunion: after playing a Drella selection on June 15, 1990, at a Warhol/Velvet Underground exhibition at the Cartier Foundation in Jouy-en-Josas, Reed and Cale were joined onstage by Sterling Morrison and Maureen Tucker for a rendition of the Velvet Underground song "Heroin", which eventually led to the first and last Velvet Underground reunion, which took place in 1993 (after which Cale and Reed, again, vowed never to work with one another again).

Critical reception

Songs for Drella received positive reviews and critical praise upon release.  In a four-star review, Rolling Stone writer Paul Evans stated "Both nearing fifty, Reed and Cale are the survivors Warhol wasn't fated to become. In popular music, only bluesmen and country greats have managed the maturity these two display." Spin described Songs for Drella as "a moving testament to one of the '60s most important icons" and named it one of the Top 20 albums of 1990.

Track listing
All songs written by Lou Reed and John Cale.

Singles
 "Nobody But You" b/w "Style It Takes" – 7" Germany 1990
 "Nobody But You"; "Style It Takes" b/w "A Dream" – 12" & CD-single Germany 1990

Personnel
 John Cale – vocals, keyboards, viola
 Lou Reed – vocals, guitar

Charts

References 

Lou Reed albums
John Cale albums
1990 albums
Albums produced by Lou Reed
Albums produced by John Cale
Concept albums
Cultural depictions of Andy Warhol
Albums in memory of deceased persons
Sire Records albums
Tribute albums to non-musicians
Collaborative albums